WCBZ-LP was a low-power television station in Central City, Louisiana, broadcasting locally on VHF channel 7 as an affiliate of My Family TV.  The station was affiliated with Central's local newspaper, the Central City News.  The station is managed by former state senator Woody Jenkins, who once owned and managed WBTR and features programming local to the Central area, such as news coverage, local sports, and council and school board meetings.  The station conducted a "test broadcast" on November 13, 2008.  Unlike many television stations, WCBZ still broadcast in analog, as it was exempt from the 2009 "Big Switch."

WCBZ went silent on October 20, 2010. On December 19, 2011, the Federal Communications Commission cancelled the station's license and deleted the WCBZ-LP call sign from its database.

References

External links

Television channels and stations established in 1989
Television channels and stations disestablished in 2011
Defunct television stations in the United States
Defunct mass media in Louisiana
1989 establishments in Louisiana
2011 disestablishments in Louisiana